Vector is the fifth studio album by British progressive metal band Haken. It was released on 26 October 2018 through Inside Out Music. It is the shortest studio album by the band and the first with a duration of less than one hour. The album was produced by the band and mixed by ex-Periphery bassist and producer Adam "Nolly" Getgood.

The album's first single, "The Good Doctor", was released on 31 August 2018 along with its official music video. The album's second single, "Puzzle Box", was released on 28 September 2018 for digital download, following the daily publication of six scrambled parts from it in the spirit of the song's theme. The original version of "Puzzle Box" is created when the scrambled parts are put into the correct order. A third single, "A Cell Divides", was released digitally on 19 October, along with its video clip.

The artwork was created by long-time collaborators Blacklake, which features a Rorschach test ink-blot design. The album is loosely connected to their following album Virus, released on 24 July 2020.

Background 
About the album, vocalist Ross Jennings commented:

Guitarist Charlie Griffiths added:

Concept 
Regarding the album's concept, Griffiths said:

When asked about the concept, keyboardist Diego Tejeida stated that the field of psychology was involved, as well as influences from psychoanalysis, Freudian theories, the Milgram experiments, Pavlovian conditioning, and operant conditioning experiments.

Critical reception 

Concluding the review for AllMusic, Thom Jurek wrote that "Haken's willingness to take chances keeps older fans in the fold because here, they've balanced a far more aggressive direction with more nuanced elements from each phase of their recorded development. Vector is at once a brave new chapter and a logical -- if surprising -- continuation of Haken's always expansive M.O."

Nick Andreas from Sonic Perspectives gave Vector 9.3 out of 10 and said: "The only major strike against Vector, if it really is one, is that we only get forty-five minutes of music. But that's all good in my book, as the band seemed to go with quality over quantity in delivering a brilliant album that might be their best sounding yet. It shows off some fresh new styles, and sees the instrumentation again finding new sounds and rhythmic approaches, all of course centered around the group's always-solid songwriting."

Track listing 

The deluxe edition of the album includes instrumental versions of all songs. The digital deluxe edition is missing the instrumental songs "Clear" and "Nil by Mouth". Also while the outro "Verbal Summator" is missing at the end of "A Cell Divides" on the digital version of the album, it is included in the instrumental version of the song.

Personnel 
Haken
 Ross Jennings – vocals
 Richard Henshall – guitars
 Charlie Griffiths – guitars
 Diego Tejeida – keyboards, sound design
 Conner Green – bass
 Raymond Hearne – drums

Additional personnel
 Miguel Gorodi – trumpets ("The Good Doctor"), flugelhorn ("Host")
 Pete Jones – additional drum programming ("Puzzle Box")
 Pete Rinaldi – additional guitars ("Veil" and "Host")

Production and design
 Haken – production
 Anthony Leung – drum engineering
 Adam "Nolly" Getgood – drum engineering, mixing, drum recording
 Diego Tejeida – vocal production and engineering
 Chris McKenzie – vocal assistant engineer
 Sebastian Sendon – mix assistant
 Ermin Hamidovic – mastering
 Blacklake – artwork, design
 Corey Meyers – logo

Charts

References 

2018 albums
Haken (band) albums
Inside Out Music albums